Clathrodrillia allyniana is a species of sea snail, a marine gastropod mollusk in the family Drilliidae.

Description
The shell grows to a length of  21 mm.

Distribution
This species is found in the Gulf of California, Western Mexico.

References

 Keen, A. Myra. "Sea shells of Tropical West America: Marine mollusks from Baja California to Peru, 1064 pp." (1971).

External links
 

allyniana
Gastropods described in 1951